is a former Japanese football player.

Playing career
Yokoyama was born in Kochi Prefecture on December 22, 1972. After graduating from Kansai University, he joined newly was promoted to J1 League club, Cerezo Osaka in 1995. He played many matches as substitute forward. He also played as starting member when Hiroaki Morishima and Akinori Nishizawa left the club for Japan national team. In 2000, he moved to Shimizu S-Pulse. In 2000, although he could not play many matches in league competition, the club won the 2nd place in Emperor's Cup. In 2001, he played many matches and the club won the champions 2001 Emperor's Cup. In Asia, the club won the 3rd place in 2000–01 Asian Cup Winners' Cup. At the 3rd place match, he scored 2 goals including winning goal. In 2003, he moved to Japan Football League club Sagawa Express Osaka. He retired end of 2003 season.

Club statistics

References

External links

1972 births
Living people
Kansai University alumni
Association football people from Kōchi Prefecture
Japanese footballers
J1 League players
Japan Football League players
Cerezo Osaka players
Shimizu S-Pulse players
Sagawa Shiga FC players
Association football forwards